KRAW was a non-commercial radio station in Sterling, Alaska, broadcasting to the Kenai, Alaska, area on 90.1 FM. KRAW signed on as KWMD on July 26, 2003, programming a non-commercial modern rock format.

KRAW ceased continuous broadcast on August 2, 2004, pending FCC approval of technical changes between several Alaska Educational Radio System (AERS) stations including a change in frequency.  However, KRAW has periodically broadcast for short periods to maintain the license.  On March 10, 2008, AERS filed with the FCC for alternative technical changes.

KRAW's license expired on May 18, 2013, due to the station having been dark for more than a year. The FCC deleted the KRAW call sign from their database on February 5, 2014.

References

External links
 Query the FCC's FM station database for KRAW

RAW
Country radio stations in the United States
Radio stations established in 2003
Defunct radio stations in the United States
Radio stations disestablished in 2014
2003 establishments in Alaska
2014 disestablishments in Alaska
RAW